Charlie Hunter (born May 23, 1967) is an American guitarist, composer, and bandleader. First coming to prominence in the early 1990s, Hunter plays custom-made seven- and eight-string guitars on which he simultaneously plays bass lines, chords, and melodies. Critic Sean Westergaard described Hunter's technique as "mind-boggling...he's an agile improviser with an ear for great tone, and always has excellent players alongside him in order to make great music, not to show off." Hunter's technique is rooted in the styles of jazz guitarists Joe Pass and Tuck Andress, two of his biggest influences, who blended bass notes with melody in a way that created the illusion of two guitars.

Biography

A native of Rhode Island, Hunter was around guitars at an early age because his mother repaired them for a living. He and his mother and sister lived for several years on a commune in Mendocino County, California, then settled in Berkeley. Hunter attended Berkeley High School and took lessons from rock guitarist Joe Satriani. At eighteen he moved to Paris. He has stated that busking in Paris gave him on the job training. Returning to San Francisco, he played seven-string guitar and organ in Michael Franti's political rap group, The Disposable Heroes of Hiphoprisy. In 1992, they were one of the opening acts for U2's Zoo TV Tour.

On his debut album, Charlie Hunter Trio (1993), he played seven-string guitar with Dave Ellis on saxophone and Jay Lane on drums. On the next album, Bing, Bing, Bing! (Blue Note, 1995), he played an eight-string guitar custom built by Ralph Novak. In the 1990s, Hunter played in the band T. J. Kirk, which got its name from three musicians whose music it covered: Thelonious Monk, James Brown, and Rahsaan Roland Kirk. The band released two albums before breaking up.

Hunter co-founded Garage a Trois, a jazz fusion band with Stanton Moore and Skerik, and Groundtruther with Bobby Previte. In the summer of 2007, he toured in a trio with keyboardist Erik Deutsch and drummer Simon Lott and recorded the album Mistico (Fantasy, 2007).

He performed on three songs on D'Angelo's album Voodoo (2000), including "The Root". He has stated that the session for the song was the most challenging session he has worked on.

He was an inaugural member of the Independent Music Awards' judging panel to support independent artists.

Equipment
Hunter plays a custom seven-string guitar made by Jeff Traugott. Previously, Hunter played a custom-made, eight-string guitar made by luthier Ralph Novak of Novax Guitars.  He played chords and lead guitar solos on the bottom five strings (tuned ADGBE), and simultaneously played bass lines on the top three strings (tuned EAD).  With the addition of a Hughes & Kettner Tube Rotosphere (a Leslie rotary speaker simulator), his unique style produced a sound similar to that of a Hammond organ—an instrument he set out to imitate.

In 2006, Hunter removed the top guitar string and had the neck of his guitar reworked and now plays a modified 7-string on the formerly-8 string body. Hunter has mentioned that because of his small hands, he had to move out of position to make use of the 8th string and thus wasn't using it much. A change in Hunter's style away from the organ sound into a more blues and distortion based sound happened at the same time.  After removing the 8th string, Hunter retuned all of the strings up a half step: F-Bb-Eb on the bass and Bb-Eb-Ab-C on the guitar. As of 2008, he had once again retuned up another whole step: G-C-F on the bass and C-F-Bb-D on the guitar.

Discography

As leader/co-leader
 Charlie Hunter Trio (Prawn Song, 1993)
 Bing, Bing, Bing! (Blue Note, 1995)
 Ready...Set...Shango! (Blue Note, 1996)
 Natty Dread (Blue Note, 1997)
 Return of the Candyman (with Pound for Pound) (Blue Note, 1998)
 Duo (with Leon Parker) (Blue Note, 1999)
 Charlie Hunter (Blue Note, 2000)
 Solo Eight-String Guitar (Contra Punto, 2000)
 Songs from the Analog Playground (Blue Note, 2001)
 Right Now Move (Ropeadope, 2003)
 Come in Red Dog, This is Tango Leader (with Bobby Previte)  (Ropeadope, 2003)
 Friends Seen and Unseen (Ropeadope, 2004)
 Earth Tones (with Earl "Chinna" Smith and Ernest Ranglin) (Green Street, 2005)
 Copperopolis (Ropeadope, 2006)
 Mistico (Fantasy, 2007)
 Baboon Strength (reapandsow, 2008)
 Gentlemen, I Neglected to Inform You You Will Not Be Getting Paid (Spire/reapandsow, 2009)
 Public Domain (2010)
 Not Getting Behind Is the New Getting Ahead (with Scott Amendola) (2012)
 Pucker (with Scott Amendola) (2013)
 Cars/Williams/Porter/Ellington (with Scott Amendola) (2014)
 Dionne Dionne (with Dionne Farris) (Free & Clear, 2014)
 Let the Bells Ring On (There, 2015)
 We Two Kings: Charlie Hunter and Bobby Previte Play the Great Carols (with Bobby Previte) (Rank Hypocrisy, 2015)
 Everybody Has a Plan Until They Get Punched in the Mouth (GroundUP, 2016)
 Charlie Hunter/Carter McLean Featuring Silvana Estrada (with Carter McLean and Silvana Estrada) (2018)
 Music! Music! Music! (with Lucy Woodward) (2019)
 Charlie Hunter/Carter McLean Volume One (with Carter McLean) (2020)
 Avant Blues (with Bobby Previte) (2020)
 I'm a Stranger Here (with Lucy Woodward) (2021)
 Sam Fribush Organ Trio Vol. 1 Riverboat (2021)
 Sam Fribush Organ Trio Vol. 2 The Root (2021)
 Kick, Snare, Baritone Guitar (Side Hustle Records, 2021)

With Groundtruther
 Latitude (Thirsty Ear, 2004)
 Longitude (Thirsty Ear, 2005)
 Altitude (Thirsty Ear, 2007)

As sideman
With Garage a Trois
 Mysteryfunk (Fog City, 1999)
 Emphasizer (Tone-Cool, 2003)
 Outre Mer (Telarc, 2005)
 Calm Down Cologne (Royal Potato Family, 2021) 

With T. J. Kirk
 T. J. Kirk (Warner Bros., 1994)
 If Four Was One (Warner Bros., 1996)
 Talking Only Makes it Worse (Ropeadope, 2003) [Live performance recorded 1997]

With Bobby Previte
 The Coalition of the Willing (Ropeadope, 2006)

With others
 Hypocrisy Is the Greatest Luxury, The Disposable Heroes of Hiphoprisy (Island, 1992)
 Spare Ass Annie and Other Tales, William S. Burroughs (Island, 1993)
 All Kooked Out!, Stanton Moore (Fog City, 1998)
 Voodoo, D'Angelo (Cheeba Sound, 2000)
 Live at Tonic, Christian McBride  (Ropeadope, 2006)
 Continuum ("In Repair"), John Mayer (2007)
 Fade (Tim Collins featuring Charlie Hunter & Simon Lott (Ropeadope, 2008)
 Go Home (Ben Goldberg, Charlie Hunter, Scott Amendola & Ron Miles (BAG Productions, 2009)
 Channel Orange ("Sweet Life") Frank Ocean (2012)
 Family Dinner Volume 2, Snarky Puppy (2016)
 The Rob Dixon Trio Coast to Crossroads Feat.Charlie Hunter and Mike Clark (2018)
 Don't Let it Stop (Petr Cancura featuring Charlie Hunter and Geoff Clapp) (Roots2Boot Recordings 2020)

Videography
 Right Now Live, (Ropeadope DVD, 2004)
 Solo Inventions, (Shanachie DVD, 2005)
 In Repair: One Song, One Day, playing 8-string with John Mayer (Aware 2006) (iTunes download)
 Solos: the Jazz Sessions, (Original Spin Media DVD, 2011)

Filmography
 Late Night with Conan O'Brien (1997)
 SOLOS: the jazz sessions (2004)
 Rochester, New York Jazz Festival (2009)
 JazzTown (2021) 
 Who Killed Jazz'' (2022)

References

External links
CharlieHunter.com
Charlie Hunter collection on the Internet Archive's live music archive

20th-century American guitarists
21st-century American guitarists
American jazz guitarists
Living people
1967 births
Ropeadope Records artists
Blue Note Records artists
Berkeley High School (Berkeley, California) alumni
Seven-string guitarists
Eight-string guitarists
American male guitarists
20th-century American male musicians
21st-century American male musicians
American male jazz musicians
GroundUPmusic artists
The Coalition of the Willing (band) members
Garage A Trois members
Thirsty Ear Recordings artists